The Fundamental Statute of the Albanian Kingdom was the constitution of the Albanian Kingdom of 1928–39. It was introduced by King Zog I of Albania.

The 1928 Fundamental Statute was replaced in 1939, after the Italian invasion of Albania.  On 3 June 1939,  King Victor Emmanuel III of Italy promulgated a new constitution for the Albanian Kingdom of 1939–43.

See also
List of constitutions of Albania

References

Bibliography
 Patrice Najbor, Histoire de l'Albanie et de sa maison royale (5 volumes), JePublie, Paris, 2008,.
 Patrice Najbor, La dynastye des Zogu, Textes & Prétextes, Paris, 2002

External links 
Maison royale d'Albanie, site officiel en langue française
Famille royale d'Albanie, site officiel en langue anglaise

Defunct constitutions
 
Legal history of Albania
1928 in law
1928 in Albania
1928 documents
1928 in politics